Muhammad Saiful Azam bin Mohamed Yusoff (born 12 May 1969) or better known as Saiful Apek is a comedian of Malaysia. He was once called "Malaysia's No.1 Comedian" during his heyday and also the title of "Sifu" by comedians today. Until today, his aura and credibility as a comedian are unparalleled and unmatched. He is known as an intellectual comedian who is knowledgeable in every word and manners while entertaining.

Apart from comedy, he is known as a Malaysian actor, director, singer, host and performer. He is also an actor who has starred in the most films in Malaysia from the past to the present until he broke the tradition as the comedian who holds the most main characters in each of his acting films. Earlier, he was a former member of the group Senario and left the group a few years later. However, he is now back with the group with the original members and rebranding themselves as Senariounion.

He was once named the Most Popular Star, Berita Harian Most Popular Star Award (ABPBH) 2003 and then carved his name in history as the first comedian to win the award. Most recently, he was named the recipient of the 2021 Comedy Icon Award at the 2021 Malaysian Industry & Entrepreneur Personality Awards. At the end of 2021, he was invited to enter the Astro-produced singing program, Gegar Vaganza Season 8 as a duo with Yassin Yahya/Anye and was known as the group Sa.Ya.

Early life 
He was born as Mohd Saifulazam bin Mohd Yusoff in Gombak, Selangor. On his birth certificate and identity card, it says 15 August 1969 but the fact is, Saiful's date of birth is 12 May 1969. The confusion was due to the events of 13 May 1969 when he had to be handed over to another family for unavoidable reasons and then only registered.

Saiful was initially raised by Jahindun binti Haji Sahin and her mother's second husband, Haji Mohammad Jaafar Ali until the death of his mother when Saiful was 21 years old.

On the day of his mother's funeral, Saiful only found out that he was an adopted child after not being allowed to kiss the forehead of his adoptive mother's corpse.

Around 1991, after migrating to Singapore, he was moved to find a biological parent who had long been separated. After obtaining information from various sources, he was finally found with 6 siblings along with his two biological parents, namely Rahmah binti Uyub and Husin bin Hashim.

In 1994, while at the Subang Parade shopping mall, he accidentally met his best friend who at the time was managing the registration of a television audition, Sinaran Pasport Kegemilangan had registered him as a participant. That was the starting point of Saiful Apek's career as an industry player in Malaysia.

Career 
Saiful's talent (who was then 25 years old) was discovered through the first season of Sinaran Pasport Kegemilangan competition in 1994 organized by TV3, thus becoming popular through the sitcom Senario which aired until 2013. He was also the host of TV3's most popular entertainment show, Melodi with Fauziah Ahmad David by using the name Apek.

Saiful owns his own production company, Gitu-Gitu Productions Sdn Bhd and was named the Most Popular Star at the Berita Harian Popular Star Award 2003 (ABPBH03). Apek made his first film appearance through a special guest character in the film Puteri Impian 2 directed by Aziz M. Osman and starring Amy Mastura. Apek and his group, Senario appeared together in their acting debut film, Senario The Movie which premiered in 1999. In this film, Apek played the role of the party boss, Apek later appeared in four more Senario acting films.

He also appeared in the telefilm Neon (2003) directed by Mohd Feroz Abdul Kader starring Faizal Yusup and Erik Fuzi with many actors including Azhar Sulaiman, Aziz M. Osman, Rashidi Ishak, Sofi Jikan, Aziz Sattar, Kuswadinata, Abby Abadi, Serina Redzuawan , Zila Bakarin, Rita Rudaini, Kartina Aziz and many more. Apek appeared with Faizal Hussein and Zul Yahya in the investigative comedy action film MX3 directed by Yusof Kelana which premiered on November 25, 2003.

Apart from that, his famous acting films are Jutawan Fakir, KL Menjerit, Gangster, Laila Isabella, Cinta Luar Biasa, Biar Betul, Gila-Gila Pengantin Popular, Kuliah Cinta, Man Laksa, Duyung, Anak Mami Kembali, Nana Tanjung, Otai, Bujang Senang, Ladyboss, Cicakman and many more.

On November 1, 2004, Apek launched his fan club Apek's F.C (A.F.C) to strengthen the relationship between him and the fans.

Saiful's most successful acting film for 2006 was Cicak-Man directed by Yusry Abdul Halim. This is the first superhero film in Malaysia. He played the main character, along with the actors involved including Fasha Sandha, Aznil Nawawi, Yasmin Hani, Yusry KRU, Jalaluddin Hassan, AC Mizal and Adlin Aman Ramlie. Apek plays the character of Hairi, a young man who accidentally swallows a lizard that is in the process of being tested in the laboratory. He and his close friend, Danny, worked at a company owned by Professor Klon, in Metrofulus City. In the same year, he appeared in the casual comedy show Gitu-Gitu Apek which aired on Astro Ria.

Apek plays the role of Jimmy in the fictional comedy film, Duyung directed by Assoc Prof A. Razak Mohaideen who paired him with Maya Karin who plays the role of Puteri. The film premiered on March 6, 2008 to commercial success. He also contributed his voice to the soundtrack of the film by singing a song entitled "Aspalela".

Apek returned to his role as Hairi/Cicakman in the film Cicakman 2 - Black Planet which premiered on December 11, 2008. His character Cicakman also made a special appearance in the film The Wedding Game.

He was offered to join Maharaja Lawak Mega 2015, but refused to maintain his position as a senior comedian. For him, there is nothing else he has to prove on the comedy stage.

However, he accepted the offer to join the Gegar Vaganza Season 8 singing program at the end of 2021 on the grounds of 'keep learning' because he is aware that in the field of singing, there is still a lot of knowledge that he needs to learn and overlooked during his youth.

Personal life 
He married Roslina Abu Hassan on 11 June 1994. They are blessed with two sons, Mohd Riyadh Aslam (born 1996) and Mohd Radzin Aiman (born 1998).

He also owns the Gitu-Gitu Char Koey Tiaw restaurant which operates in Penang. In 2013, Apek decided to quit smoking because he was concerned about his health.

Controversy 
Saiful Apek was found guilty of injecting cannabis into his body on June 12, 2010. On 22 May 2013, the Shah Alam High Court ordered him to defend himself after allowing the prosecution's appeal against the Magistrate's Court's decision to acquit them of the charges on 25 June of the same year.

Apek and his employees were released after finding that the prosecution had failed to prove a prima facie case. On April 25, 2014, Apek and three of his employees were each fined RM2,500 by the High Court here on Friday after being found guilty of injecting cannabis into the body.

Filmography

Film

Television

Television series

Telemovie

Discography

Single 
 Saiful Apek & Famili - Kalakian - (2009; featuring. Diarra) 
 Saiful Apek & Famili - Hua Hua Hua - (2009) 
 Pak Pung - (2013; Isma AF7 & featuring. Altimet)

Awards and nominations

References

External links
 
 
 
 

1969 births
Living people
Malaysian comedians
Malaysian male actors
Malaysian people of Malay descent